Guns for San Sebastian is a 1968 action-adventure film based on the 1962 novel A Wall for San Sebastian, written by Rev. Fr. William Barnaby "Barby" Faherty, S.J. The film is directed by Frenchman Henri Verneuil, and stars Anthony Quinn, Anjanette Comer and Charles Bronson. The score is by Ennio Morricone, who would then use his work in this film as an inspiration for the main theme in The Mercenary. Filming took place in Sierra de Órganos National Park in the town of Sombrerete, Mexico It was made as a co-production between France, Italy, Mexico, and the United States.

It is a rare instance of a Spaghetti Western actually being shot in Mexico, instead of substituting Spain or some similar European location.

Plot
In 1746 Mexico, a womanizing outlaw, the army deserter Leon Alastray (Anthony Quinn) is wounded and pursued by the Spanish military into a church. He is given sanctuary by a sympathetic priest (Sam Jaffe), who will not turn Alastray over to the military. The church authorities side with the army, and when the priest still refuses to hand Alastray over they send him to minister to a remote village, San Sebastian. The priest smuggles Alastray, who is proudly atheistic and anti-clerical, past the soldiers surrounding the church. Alastray feels guilty for what has happened to the priest, so accompanies him to the village to ensure he gets there safely. However, he is angry and embittered throughout the trip.

They arrive at San Sebastian to find the church barely stands and the village apparently abandoned. The priest is killed by a marauding vaquero, but his ringing of the church bell brings the villagers out from their hiding places in the surrounding hills. They hide there because they are regularly terrorized by Yaqui Indians. The villagers mistake Alastray for a priest. He at first denies it and is scornful of them, but, guided by a persistent village woman, Kinita (Anjanette Comer), to whom he is attracted, decides to take on the role and organize the villagers. They are aided by the persuasive power of an accident the villagers think is a miracle.

Teclo (Charles Bronson) is a half-breed leader of the vaqueros. He pretends to side with the villagers, but in reality wants them to be scattered in the hills permanently, under his leadership. While Alastray organizes the men of the village to build a dam, the Yaqui attack and massacre many of the inhabitants of the village. The angry villagers order the priest out. Alastray leaves, with Kinita following. He tells her all his life he has fallen just short of achieving something meaningful, and sends her back to the village. A storm of approaching riders are heard, and the two take cover. They see Teclo and the Yaqui leader, Golden Lance (Jaime Fernández) together, and realize the alliance of those two means terrible things for the village.

Alastray goes to the capital and, using a previous romantic connection, obtains muskets, gunpowder, and a cannon, which he takes back to the village. When the villagers see the weapons, they are encouraged and willing to fight. Alastray makes a peace overture to Golden Lance, which is initially successful, but Teclo sabotages it and a Yaqui attack is inevitable.

On the eve of the battle, the villagers ask Alastray to lead them in a Mass. He tells them he is not a priest, but they nonetheless accept him. Together, they repel the Yaqui attack on the village, but they use up most of their gunpowder and their prospects appear grim. However, a village boy out playing sees the vaqueros and the Yaquis gather in preparation for the next day's attack. During the night, Alastray and a few villagers set charges in a mountainside overlooking the gathering place, to explode rocks down onto the attackers.

The next morning, Teclo rides by and sees the fuse to the charges, but the villagers kill him before he can do anything about it. The Yaquis gather below the rocks, and most, including Golden Lance, are killed when the charges are detonated. With the area pacified, government authorities come to administer the village. A military officer recognizes Alastray and sends soldiers to capture him. The villagers outwit the soldiers, getting them to pursue a decoy. Alastray flees on horseback in the opposite direction, with Kinita riding after him.

Cast

Production

Differences between the novel and the film
The original novel by Faherty had the hero be a former soldier who became a Jesuit cleric, as opposed to the film's depiction of the hero as an army deserter and atheist bandit. The Indians in the novel were Comanche, rather than Yaqui, and the half-breed character played by Charles Bronson does not appear in the book.

Notes

External links

 

1968 films
1968 Western (genre) films
1960s action adventure films
1960s historical adventure films
American historical adventure films
French historical adventure films
Mexican historical adventure films
Italian historical adventure films
French Western (genre) films
Spaghetti Western films
Mexican Western (genre) films
Films based on Western (genre) novels
Films directed by Henri Verneuil
Metro-Goldwyn-Mayer films
Films scored by Ennio Morricone
Films set in Mexico
Films set in the 1740s
Italian historical action films
English-language French films
English-language Italian films
English-language Mexican films
French historical action films
1960s English-language films
1960s American films
1960s Italian films
1960s French films
1960s Mexican films